Foros may refer to:
 Foros, Crimea, a resort town in Crimea
 Foros Group, a boutique investment group headquartered in New York City
 Foros Timis Ston Greco, a classical album by Greek electronic composer and artist Vangelis
 Foros (crater), an impact crater in the Argyre quadrangle of Mars
 Foros (icebreaker), a Latvian icebreaking salvage tug

See also
 Phoros, membership dues paid to Athens by the members of the Delian League in Classical Greece